Durk van der Mei (13 October 1924, Brummen – 2 February 2018, Zutphen) was a Dutch politician who was Secretary of State from 1977 to 1981.

References

1924 births
2018 deaths
Dutch politicians
Christian Democratic Appeal politicians
Christian Historical Union politicians
Members of the House of Representatives (Netherlands)
MEPs for the Netherlands 1958–1979
State Secretaries for Foreign Affairs of the Netherlands
Commanders of the Order of Orange-Nassau
Knights of the Order of the Netherlands Lion
People from Brummen